Tredgold is a surname, and may refer to:

 A. F. Tredgold (1870–1952), British mental health expert and author
 John Harfield Tredgold (1798–1842), English chemist 
 Nye Tredgold, pseudonym of Nigel Tranter 
 Robert Clarkson Tredgold (1899–1977), British barrister and judge
 Roger Tredgold (1911–1975), British Olympic fencer 
 Thomas Tredgold (1788–1829), English engineer and author